Libert (Lisbert, Libertus) of Sint-Truiden (died 783) was a Belgian saint.  Born as Count Libert of Adone in Mechelen, he was baptized and educated by Saint Rumoldus.  Libert became a Benedictine monk.

He became a monk at the abbey of Sint-Truiden.  He was killed by barbarians.  His feast day is July 14.

External links
Saints of July 14: Libert (Lisbert) of Saint-Trond

Belgian Roman Catholic saints
Belgian Benedictines
783 deaths
8th-century Christian saints
Year of birth unknown